"White Key" is the fourth single released by Japanese singer Ami Suzuki under music label Sony Music in December 1998.

Information
The main song of the single was also at the TV commercial of the Japanese product "Kissmark", in the same way that "all night long" was used before. The full single was produced by Tetsuya Komuro.

This it's also her second single that includes a b-side; the first was her debut single "love the island".

Following her blacklisting from the music industry in September 2000, production and distribution of the single stopped in its entirety.

Track listing
White Key
Composed by Cozy Kubo & TK
Written by Marc & TK
Produced by Tetsuya Komuro
White Key (Doze of Mix)
Remixed by TK

Composed by Cozy Kubo & TK
Written by Marc & TK
Produced by Tetsuya Komuro
White Key (TV Mix)

Charts
Oricon Sales Chart (Japan)

Ami Suzuki songs
1998 singles
1998 songs